Cropper may refer to:

Cropper (surname)
A piece of agricultural machinery used to mow grass or crop wheat
Camp Cropper, a detention site near Baghdad, Iraq
Cropper, Kentucky, an unincorporated community, United States
Cropper, Derbyshire, a hamlet in the parish of Osleston and Thurvaston
An icon in Adobe Photoshop used to crop images on the program
Cropper, a breed of fancy pigeon, including:
Holle Cropper
Norwich Cropper
Ghent Cropper
Old German Cropper
Voorburg shield cropper
James Cropper plc, English papermaking company

See also
Share cropper